Haji Fazl-e-Raziq was a Pakistani politician from Buner District who served twice as a member of the National Assembly of Pakistan in 1977 and 1988 to 1990.

References

People from Buner District
Pakistani MNAs 1977
Pakistani MNAs 1988–1990
Jamaat-e-Islami Pakistan politicians